The canton of Ghisonaccia is an administrative division of the Haute-Corse department, southeastern France. It was created at the French canton reorganisation which came into effect in March 2015. Its seat is in Ghisonaccia.

It consists of the following communes:
 
Aghione
Aléria
Altiani
Ampriani
Antisanti
Campi
Casevecchie
Ghisonaccia
Giuncaggio
Linguizzetta
Matra
Moïta
Pancheraccia
Pianello
Piedicorte-di-Gaggio
Pietraserena
Tallone
Tox
Zalana
Zuani

References

Cantons of Haute-Corse